Berat Ahmeti (born 26 January 1995) is a Kosovar footballer who plays as a forward for KF Gjilani in the Kosovo Superleague.

Career statistics

Club

Honours
Újpest
Hungarian Super Cup (1): 2014–15

References

External links
 Profile 
 

1995 births
Living people
Sportspeople from Pristina
Kosovo Albanians
Kosovan footballers
Albanian men's footballers
Albania youth international footballers
Association football midfielders
Association football forwards
FC Prishtina players
Újpest FC players
KF Vllaznia Shkodër players
SC Gjilani players
KF Feronikeli players
KF Trepça'89 players
Nemzeti Bajnokság I players
Kategoria Superiore players
Kosovan expatriate footballers
Albanian expatriate footballers
Expatriate footballers in Albania
Kosovan expatriate sportspeople in Albania
Expatriate footballers in Hungary
Kosovan expatriate sportspeople in Hungary
Albanian expatriate sportspeople in Hungary